"In a World like This" is a song by American pop group Backstreet Boys from their eighth studio album of the same name. It was released as the album's lead single on June 25, 2013 as a digital download and July 3, 2013 on CD in Japan. The song was written by Kristian Lundin, Max Martin, Savan Kotecha, and it was produced by Martin and Lundin. This song was featured on the 2013 compilation album Hitzone 67.

Background and recording

In April 2013, Nick Carter revealed that the group had recorded a song with Swedish producer Max Martin, who was responsible for some of the group's biggest hits including, "I Want It That Way", "Quit Playing Games (with My Heart)" and "Everybody (Backstreet's Back)". Carter called it both a "beautiful song" and a "smash". He later described the group's relationship with Martin as "symbiotic" and said, "We've changed each other's lives. Everything seems right now. It just seems like the right fit. The right time for him because he's a really busy man, but what we created together from our hits... they're kind of like masterpieces in his mind. So he wanted to live up to that in a certain way. So that's why it took this long to maybe come back around. It was just the right time for both of us."

On June 18, 2013 Backstreet Boys announced that "In a World like This" would be released as the first single from their upcoming eighth studio album on June 25. The track subsequently premiered on radio Z100 New York the same day, and was made available on YouTube.

Commercial performance
The single did not enter the overall Billboard Hot 100 due to poor promotion of radio airplay, but it peaked No.18 on Hot Single Sales Chart. The single was a hit in Asia. Continuing the success of their first single "Straight Through My Heart" from This Is Us, it debuted at No. 13 on Oricon Singles Chart. In the second week it rose and peaked at No. 6, No. 1 on Adult Contemporary Chart, and No. 3 on Airplay Chart. The single also charted at No. 63 on Oricon's Year-End Chart. It was certificated Gold in Japan. 
In Taiwan, the song topped the chart for four consecutive weeks and was the eight-biggest Western artists' single for 2013.

Music video
The music video for "In a World like This" was filmed in Los Angeles. The video was premiered on Good Morning America was made available to watch on Vevo shortly thereafter.

The concept of the video is based on the song lyrics, which is about how love conquers all and with real love one can overcome anything. The video explores three well-known moments in American history: the first landing of the moon, the September 11 attacks, and the overturn of Prop 8.

Track listing
 Digital download
"In a World like This" - 3:40

 Japanese CD single
"In a World like This" - 3:39
"In a World like This" (Acapella) - 3:31
"In a World like This" (Instrumental) - 3:39

 The Remixes
"In a World like This" - 3:40
"In a World like This" (Manhattan Clique Club Mix) - 5:57
"In a World like This" (Adam Rockford Remix)- 6:19
"In a World like This" (Varun Remix) - 5:00
"In a World like This" (Drezo Remix) - 6:42
"In a World like This" (DJ Lynnwood Remix) - 6:18

Charts and certifications

Weekly charts

Year-end charts

Release history

References

2013 singles
2013 songs
Backstreet Boys songs
Song recordings produced by Max Martin
Songs written by Max Martin
Songs written by Savan Kotecha
Songs written by Kristian Lundin